Uro is a rural locality (a selo) in Barguzinsky District, Republic of Buryatia, Russia. The population was 1,160 as of 2010. There are 13 streets.

Geography 
Uro is located 25 km southeast of Barguzin (the district's administrative centre) by road. Maloye Uro is the nearest rural locality.

References 

Rural localities in Barguzinsky District